The Fiji green emo skink or Viti slender treeskink (Emoia concolor) is a species of lizard in the family Scincidae. It is found on Rotuma in Fiji.

References

Emoia
Reptiles described in 1851
Taxa named by Auguste Duméril